George Gage may refer to:

George Gage (diplomat) (fl. 1614–1640), English Roman Catholic political agent
George Gage (Ringatū minister) (c. 1896–1961), New Zealand Māori minister
George Gage, 7th Viscount Gage (1932–1993), English baronet, Irish peer, and landowner
George Gage (politician) (1813–1899), Illinois politician
George W. Gage (judge) (1854–1926), associate justice of the South Carolina Supreme Court
George W. Gage (baseball) (1812–1875), American baseball executive